Karen is an American sitcom that aired on ABC beginning in January 1975. A mid-season replacement, Karen was designed as a starring vehicle for actress Karen Valentine. The show was canceled after four months due to low ratings.

Plot
Karen Angelo is an ambitious, enthusiastic worker for Open America, a liberal citizen's lobby in Washington, D.C.  Karen is assisted in finding (and uncovering) corrupt managers by Dale Busch, the cantankerous founder of Open America (played by Denver Pyle in the pilot episode, Charles Lane would later play the role).

Cast
Karen Valentine as Karen Angelo
Charles Lane as Dale Busch
Dena Dietrich as Dena Madison

Episodes

References
TV Guide Guide to TV 2006 (2006)

Notes

External links
 

1975 American television series debuts
1975 American television series endings
1970s American sitcoms
American Broadcasting Company original programming
1970s American political comedy television series
English-language television shows
Television series by 20th Century Fox Television
Television shows set in Washington, D.C.